The 2020 Missouri Tigers baseball team represents the University of Missouri in the 2020 NCAA Division I baseball season. The Tigers play their home games at Taylor Stadium under fourth year coach Steve Bieser.

Previous season
The Tigers finished 34–22–1 overall, and 13–16–1 in the conference.

2019 MLB draft
The Tigers had five players drafted in the 2019 MLB draft.

Players in bold are signees drafted from high school that will attend Missouri.

Personnel

Roster

Coaching staff

Schedule and results

Schedule Source:
*Rankings are based on the team's current ranking in the D1Baseball poll.

References

Missouri
Missouri Tigers baseball seasons
Missouri Tigers baseball